House at 328 North Peterboro Street is a historic home located at Canastota in Madison County, New York, U.S.A.  It was built about 1870 and is a large, two story frame residence designed with an eclectic representation of the Queen Anne and Eastlake styles.  It features an elaborate Eastlake porch with a variety of ornamental woodwork.

It was added to the National Register of Historic Places in 1986.

References

Houses on the National Register of Historic Places in New York (state)
Queen Anne architecture in New York (state)
Houses completed in 1870
Shingle Style houses
Houses in Madison County, New York
National Register of Historic Places in Madison County, New York
Shingle Style architecture in New York (state)